Letchmore Heath is a village in Hertfordshire in England, situated about three miles east of Watford.

General
The village, consisting of about 150 houses, lies to the east of Watford, southwest of Radlett and southeast of Aldenham.

Due to its proximity to Elstree Studios, it has often been used as a set in films, in particular the 1960 British horror movie Village of the Damned.

The name Letchmore is derived from the Old Saxon "leche mere", meaning muddy pond. The present pond is located to the south of the village green.

To the west, but still within the village, is Bhaktivedanta Manor.

Transport
Letchmore Heath has no main roads running through it and no public transport. It is, however, close to the M1 and M25 motorways. The nearest railway stations are at Radlett, Stanmore, Elstree & Borehamwood and Watford.

Famous residents
A. C. Bhaktivedanta Swami Prabhupada (1896-1977), the founder of the International Society for Krishna Consciousness, commonly known as the Hare Krishnas, stayed in Letchmore Heath for a few months every year after establishing Bhaktivedanta Manor, a temple, in the village.

He commented about Letchmore Heath, that because it was so beautiful with many forest walks, it reminded him of Krishna’s birthplace, Vrindavana. He would daily go on long walks through the village and appreciated its cleanliness.

Graphic designer David Rudnick was born in Letchmore Heath and spent his formative years there.

Novelist Joanna Briscoe spent her early years here, and the location inspired the setting for her novel 'Touched.

References

External links

Aldenham
History of science fiction
Villages in Hertfordshire